Krasnorechka is a rural locality (a village) in Annovsky Selsoviet, Belebeyevsky District, Bashkortostan, Russia. The population was 5 as of 2010. There is 1 street.

Geography 
Krasnorechka is located 8 km northeast of Belebey (the district's administrative centre) by road.

References 

Rural localities in Belebeyevsky District